Palacios is a Spanish surname meaning palace. It is the plural form of the habitational surname Palacio. Notable people with the name include:

  (1869–1935), Foreign Minister of Bolivia
 Alfredo Palacios (1880–1965), Argentine politician
 Antonia Palacios (1904–2001), Venezuelan writer
 Antonio Palacios (1874–1945), Spanish architect
 Antonio Palacios Lanza (born 1952), Venezuelan chess master
 Antonio José Martínez Palacios, a Spanish composer
 Bárbara Palacios (born 1963), Venezuelan entrepreneur, Miss Universe 1986
 Claudia Palacios (born 1977), Colombian journalist and newscaster
 Eloy Palacios (1847–1919), Venezuelan sculptor
 Emilio Palacios (born 1982), Nicaraguan footballer
 Ernesto Palacios de la Prida (1943–2000), Spanish chess master
 Exequiel Palacios (born 1998), Argentine footballer
 Felipa Palacios (born 1975), Colombian track and field athlete
 Fermín Palacios, 19th-century president of El Salvador
  (born 1950), Venezuelan musician and wife of José Ignacio Cabrujas
 Isabel Palacios (scientist), winner of a 2019 Suffrage Science award
 Josh Palacios (born 1995), American baseball player
 Juan Palacios (disambiguation)
 Juan Palacios (basketball) (born 1985), Colombian basketball player
 Juan Palacios (boxer) (born 1980), Nicaraguan boxer
 Juan Palacios (cyclist) (born 1962), Ecuadorian cyclist
 Juan José Palacios (1944–2002), Spanish musician and record producer
 Karen Palacios, Venezuelan clarinetist
 Lucila Palacios, a Venezuelan poet 
 Luis Esteban Palacios, Venezuelan Chairman of the Inter-American Scout Committee
 Marco Antonio Palacios (born 1981), Mexican football player, also known as Pikolin
 Marcos Palacios (fl. 2000s–2010s), American music producer
 Miguel Asín Palacios (1871–1944), Spanish scholar and Roman Catholic priest who published Islam and the Divine Comedy in 1919
 Nicolás Palacios (1854–1931), Chilean physician and writer, best known for his racial ideas
 Odón Betanzos Palacios (1925–2007), Spanish writer
 Rafael Palacios (priest) (died 1979), Roman Catholic El Salvadoran priest
 Rafael Palacios (artist) (1905–1993), Puerto Rican-American artist and map-drawer
 Raimundo Andueza Palacios, a 19th-century president of Venezuela
 Rey Palacios (born 1962), American former baseball player
 Richie Palacios (born 1997), American baseball player
 Roberto Palacios (born 1972), Peruvian football player
 Santiago Palacios (born 1991), Mexican football (soccer) player
 Steve Palacios (born 1993), American soccer player
 Tatiana (singer) (born 1968), Mexican singer and actress known as Tatiana
 Victoria Palacios (born 1977), Mexican race walker
 Wilson Palacios (born 1984), Honduran football player

See also
 Palacios (disambiguation)

References 

Spanish-language surnames